Caversham is an electoral ward of the Borough of Reading, in the English county of Berkshire. It is to the north of the town centre, in the suburb of Caversham to the north of the River Thames, and is bordered by Thames, Peppard and Abbey wards.

As with all wards, apart from smaller Mapledurham, it elects three councillors to Reading Borough Council.  Elections since 2004 are held by thirds, with elections in three years out of four.

In the 2011 the Conservative Party won followed by a Labour Party or Labour and Co-operative Party candidate winning in 2012 and 2014 and 2019.

These Councillors are currently, in order of election: Richard Davies (Lab and Coop), Adele Barnett-Ward (Labour and Coop) and Ayo Sokale (Labour and Coop).

References

Wards of Reading